The Molniya-M (meaning "lightning"), designation 8K78M, was a Soviet Union (later Russian) launch vehicle derived from the R-7 Semyorka Intercontinental ballistic missile (ICBM).

The original 8K78 booster had been the product of a rushed development program and its launch record was no better than the 8K72 Luna booster of 1958–1960. As 1962 ended, there had been 12 launches of 8K78s, 10 of which failed (five Blok L failures, four Blok I failures, and one failure caused by the Blok A core stage). The two successful launches had had their probes (Venera 1 and Mars 1) fail en route to their respective planetary targets. As such, work began at the Korolev Bureau to improve the basic 8K78 vehicle. The core and strap-ons engines were enhanced still further and the Kosberg Bureau completely redesigned the Blok I stage. The Blok L engine was also slightly enhanced. The first six 8K78Ms built used RD-0108 engines in the Blok I stage, which was also used in the two crewed Voskhod boosters, all subsequent 8K78Ms using RD-0110 engines which were shared with the Soyuz booster.

The 8K78M was first launched in 1964; however, the existing stock of 8K78s had not been used up yet and they continued to fly until 1967. During 1967, the improved core stage and strap-ons from the Soyuz 11A57 were adopted and made standard on all R-7 based vehicles. It made 297 launches and experienced 21 failures. There were no failures of 8K78Ms caused by the core and strap-ons, and after 1968, all failures were caused by the Blok L stage until 2005 when one of the last boosters flown suffered a Blok I engine failure. The final flight of a Molniya-M lofted an Oko early warning satellite from Plesetsk on 30 September 2010 despite some apprehension that the launch vehicle, manufactured in 2005, had exceeded its storage life. It was replaced by the Soyuz-2/Fregat.

Although originally developed for planetary probes, those had switched to the larger Proton booster by the 1970s due to increasing mass and complexity. For most of its operational life, the Molniya-M was used to launch its namesake Molniya and also Oko satellites into Molniya orbits, orbits of high eccentricity that allow satellites to dwell over polar regions.

Variants 
There were four main variants of the Molniya-M, which varied in terms of their upper stage. Originally, the Block L stage was used; however, uprated versions replaced this with more powerful, or specialized, stages, for different missions. The Molniya-M/2BL, used to launch Oko missile defense spacecraft, had a Block 2BL upper stage, The Molniya-M/ML had a Block ML upper stage, and the Molniya-M/SO-L had a Block SO-L stage.

Retirement 
The Molniya-M/ML was scheduled to be the last variant to fly, with two launches of Molniya spacecraft scheduled to occur in 2008; however, they were cancelled in light of the launch failure in 2005, in favour of the Meridian spacecraft. The Molniya-M was believed to have been retired on 23 October 2007 after launching an Oko spacecraft; however, this later proved to have been incorrect, when a Molniya-M was used to launch another Oko satellite on 2 December 2008. Following a launch on 30 September 2010, the Russian Space Forces confirmed that it had been retired from service.

See also 

 Molniya-L

References 

1964 in spaceflight
2010 in spaceflight
Space launch vehicles of the Soviet Union
R-7 (rocket family)
Space launch vehicles of Russia
Vehicles introduced in 1964